Formula Sun Grand Prix 2011 was held at the Indianapolis Motor Speedway in Indianapolis, Indiana, as part of the Indianapolis 500's 100th-anniversary celebrations. The University of Minnesota's Centaurus II took first place overall.

Auto races in the United States
2011 in sports in Indiana
2011 in American motorsport
Motorsport in Indianapolis